Davant is an unincorporated community located in the delta of the Mississippi River in the parish of Plaquemines, Louisiana, United States.

Geography 

Davant had some levees that protected the town from flooding, but were destroyed due to Hurricane Katrina.

Hurricane Katrina 
The city was inundated by the water at the time of the hurricane, in 2005.

However, it was recently announced that it will receive $US 5,900,000 to rebuild, with new  homes in Davant.

References 

Unincorporated communities in Plaquemines Parish, Louisiana
Unincorporated communities in New Orleans metropolitan area
Unincorporated communities in Louisiana
Louisiana populated places on the Mississippi River